The Purdue Boilermakers women's basketball team is a college basketball program that competes in NCAA Division I and the Big Ten Conference. Purdue is rich in tradition and history, holding the record for Big Ten Championships, along with annually ranking in the top 10 nationally in home attendance. The Boilermakers have appeared in the NCAA Final Four three times, and won the NCAA National Championship in 1999. The Boilermakers share a classic rivalry with the Indiana Hoosiers, of which Purdue owns a 52–27 series lead.

History
In 1975, women's basketball became an intercollegiate sport at Purdue University. In 1982, the sport was elevated to revenue status, which meant more money was available. Under Coach Lin Dunn, Purdue qualified for its first NCAA Tournament game in 1989. Ten years later, Purdue won its first national championship by beating Duke University in the title game. Sharon Versyp, a former Purdue standout, was introduced as the head coach at the start of the 2006 season.

Current coaching staff
Source:

 Katie Gearlds - Head Coach
 Beth Couture - Associate Coach
 Michael Scruggs - Assistant Coach/Recruiting Coordinator
 Alex Guyton - Assistant Coach
 Jaelen Nice - Graduate Assistant
 Karmell Brown - Graduate Assistant
 Jessica Lipsett - Trainer
 Jason Pullara - Strength Coach

Year by year results

Conference tournament winners noted with # Source 

|-style="background: #ffffdd;"
| colspan="8" align="center" | Big Ten Conference

NCAA tournament results

National Awards

National Player of the Year (2)

 MaChelle Joseph (1992)
 Stephanie White (1999)

Wade Trophy (1)
 Stephanie White (1999)

All-American Consensus Selections (7)
 Joy Holmes (1991)
 MaChelle Joseph (1992)
 Stacey Lovelace (1995)
 Stephanie White (1999)
 Katie Douglas (2000, 2001)
 Shereka Wright (2004)

Academic All-American First Team Selections (5)
 Sue Bartz (1982)
 Carol Emanuel (1983)
 Stephanie White (1999)
 Camille Cooper (2001)
 Katie Douglas (2001)
 Candice Hall (2001)

National Coach of the Year (1)
 Carolyn Peck (1999)

Big Ten Awards

Player of the Year (8)
 Joy Holmes (1991)
 MaChelle Joseph (1992)
 Stacey Lovelace (1995)
 Jannon Roland (1997)
 Stephanie White (1999)
 Katie Douglas (2000, 2001)
 Shereka Wright (2004)

Suzy Favor Female Athlete of the Year (4)
 Joy Holmes (1991)
 MaChelle Joseph (1992)
 Stephanie White (1999)
 Katie Douglas (2001)

Chicago Tribune Silver Basketball Recipient (6)
 Joy Holmes (1991)
 MaChelle Joseph (1992)
 Stacey Lovelace (1995)
 Jannon Roland (1997)
 Stephanie White (1999)
 Katie Douglas (2001)

Defensive Player of the Year (4)
 Kelly Komara (2002)
 Lindsay Wisdom-Hylton (2007)
 Ae'Rianna Harris (2018, 2019) - the first two-time winner in Purdue history.

6th Player of the Year (2)
 Brittany Rayburn (2009)
 Whitney Bays (2014)

Freshman of the Year (3)
 MaChelle Joseph (1989)
 Leslie Johnson (1994)
 Katie Gearlds (2004)

Coach of the Year (5)
 Ruth Jones (1986)
 Lin Dunn (1989,1991)
 Nell Fortner (1997)
 Carolyn Peck (1999)

All-time records

Big Ten Win/Loss Records (As of 2015 Regular Season)
 Illinois: 52-17
 Indiana: 52-27
 Iowa: 36-30
 Maryland: 1-5
 Michigan: 50-18
 Michigan State: 38-29
 Minnesota: 43-19
 Nebraska: 5-2
 Northwestern: 45-21
 Ohio State: 28-43
 Penn State: 27-19
 Rutgers: 2-2
 Wisconsin: 48-18

Career records
 Most Points: MaChelle Joseph - 2,405 (1989–91)
 Most Rebounds: Stacey Lovelace - 876 (1993–96)
 Most Assists: MaChelle Joseph - 628 (1989–91)
 Most Steals: Katie Douglas - 327 (1998-01)
 Most Blocks: Ae’Rianna Harris  - 350 (2016–20)
 Most 3-Point Field Goals: Katie Gearlds - 238 (2003–07)

Single season records
 Most Points: Stephanie White (1998–99) / Katie Gearlds (2006–07) - 707
 Most Rebounds: Leslie Johnson - 306 (1993–94)
 Most Assists: Lisa Jahner - 201 (1987–88)
 Most Steals: Kelly Komara - 120 (2001–02)
 Most Blocks: Lindsay Wisdom-Hylton - 108 (2006–07)
 Most 3-Point Field Goals: Katie Gearlds - 88 (2006–07)

Single game records
 Most Points: Katie Gearlds - 41 (2007)
 Most Rebounds: Leslie Schultz - 25 (1981)
 Most Assists: MaChelle Joseph - 16 (1992)
 Most Steals: Joy Holmes - 12 (1989)

See also
 1999 NCAA Division I women's basketball tournament
 List of teams with the most victories in NCAA Division I women's college basketball

References

External links